Scoparia erythroneura is a moth in the family Crambidae. It was described by Turner in 1937. It is found in Australia, where it has been recorded from South Australia.

References

Moths described in 1937
Scorparia